Lugones (Santiago del Estero) is a municipality and village in Santiago del Estero in Argentina.

At the  it had 877 inhabitants, which represents an increase of 34.9% over the 650 in previous .

References

Populated places in Santiago del Estero Province